Radio occultation (RO) is a remote sensing technique used for measuring the physical properties of a planetary atmosphere or ring system. Other satellite carriers onboard GNSS-Radio occultation include CHAMP (satellite), GRACE and GRACE-FO, MetOp and the recently launched COSMIC-2.

Atmospheric radio occultation
Atmospheric radio occultation relies on the detection of a change in a radio signal as it passes through a planet's atmosphere, i.e. as it is occulted by the atmosphere. When electromagnetic radiation passes through the atmosphere, it is refracted (or bent). The magnitude of the refraction depends on the gradient of refractivity normal to the path, which in turn depends on the density gradient. The effect is most pronounced when the radiation traverses a long atmospheric limb path. At radio frequencies the amount of bending cannot be measured directly; instead the bending can be calculated using the Doppler shift of the signal given the geometry of the emitter and receiver. The amount of bending can be related to the refractive index by using an Abel transform on the formula relating bending angle to refractivity. In the case of the neutral atmosphere (below the ionosphere) information on the atmosphere's temperature, pressure and water vapour content can be derived giving radio occultation data applications in meteorology.

GNSS radio occultation
GNSS radio occultation (GNSS-RO), historically also known as GPS radio occultation (GPS-RO or GPSRO), is a type of radio occultation that relies on radio transmissions from GPS (Global Positioning System), or more generally from GNSS (Global Navigation Satellite System), satellites. This is a relatively new technique (first applied in 1995) for performing atmospheric measurements. It is used as a weather forecasting tool, and could also be harnessed in monitoring climate change. The technique involves a low-Earth-orbit satellite receiving a signal from a GPS satellite. The signal has to pass through the atmosphere and gets refracted along the way. The magnitude of the refraction depends on the temperature and water vapor concentration in the atmosphere.

GNSS radio occultation amounts to an almost instantaneous depiction of the atmospheric state. The relative position between the GPS satellite and the low-Earth-orbit satellite changes over time, allowing for a vertical scanning of successive layers of the atmosphere.

GPSRO observations can also be conducted from aircraft or on high mountaintops.

Planetary satellite missions

Current missions include REX on New Horizons.

Satellite missions
 CLARREO
 Microlab 1
 FORMOSAT-3/COSMIC
 FORMOSAT-7/COSMIC-2
 CHAMP
 GRACE
 Oceansat
 Sentinel-6 Michael Freilich
 GRAS sensor onboard MetOp satellite
 Spire LEMUR cubesats

See also
Atmospheric limb sounding
Bistatic radar

References

External links
 COSMIC Project Website
 GeoOptics LLC Website - First commercial operational RO Constellation
  PlanetIQ Website 
 ROM SAF monitoring
 ROM SAF website
ECMWF monitoring
 GENESIS Website 

Planetary science
Satellite navigation
Satellite meteorology
Radio